The Yorkshire Dales Railway was a branch line linking the town of Skipton with the villages of Rylstone, Threshfield and Grassington in North Yorkshire, England. There were two stations on the line - Grassington & Threshfield and Rylstone - and a connection via the Skipton to Ilkley Line to Skipton.

The line closed to passengers in 1930, but is still in use up to Swinden Quarry for the transportation of aggregates. It is also known as the Grassington Branch.

History

The first sod was cut on 7 June 1900 and the single-track line was opened to traffic on 29 July 1902. It was operated by the Midland Railway from the start.

The station at Grassington & Threshfield was built  short of Grassington itself, thereby saving the cost of having to cross the River Wharfe. The station was built as a through station despite being the line's terminus, because there were plans to extend the line northwards to Hawes, where it would meet the Wensleydale Railway. Those plans were never realised.

The line was single track from Embsay Junction throughout, however, the section from Skipton to Embsay Junction was double track by virtue of the already existing Skipton to Ilkley line which was opened in 1888. A passing loop was installed at Rylstone when traffic from the quarries at Swinden and Skirethornes (the latter via the  tramway at Threshfield) increased in number. The passing loop was actually north west of the station's one platform, so trains would have to wait outside the station for the other service to pass. The loop was removed in 1937, as a result of, but some years after, the cessation of passenger workings.

Connection to the end of the YDR was by a small exchange siding and a  gauge rope-hauled tramway. The exchange siding was just east of the main road through Threshfield, and the tramway extended to Skirethorns underneath the Grassington and Kettlewell roads. Traffic consisted of lime being taken to the Sheffield steel mills and had ceased by 1966 when the quarry was taken over by another company.

Regular passenger services ceased on 22 September 1930, but freight and occasional excursion trains continued until 11 August 1969. The line was the last steam-worked branchline on the British Railways system, with steam finally giving way in the summer of 1968. After August 1969, the line was cut back to Swinden Quarry and it focussed strictly on sending out limestone. In 1970, new owners promoted an upsurge in rail-borne traffic which necessitated a pipeline being laid to power the kilns with gas rather than coal. As the B6265 (Skipton to Grassington road) ran between the quarry works and the railway, movements across the road had become hazardous and the company paid for the road to be moved to the eastern side of the railway line. This was completed in 1973.

The YDR remains a freight-only line used for carrying bulk trainloads of limestone aggregate from the quarry to terminals in Leeds, Hull, Birmingham and Wellingborough.

The "Yorkshire Dales Railway" name survives as that of the trust that operates the Embsay and Bolton Abbey Steam Railway.

The idea of full re-opening of the line to passengers, or an extension of the current Embsay and Bolton Abbey Steam Railway into Skipton, has been raised ever since the line's closure to passengers.

In January 2019, Campaign for Better Transport released a report identifying the line which was listed as Priority 2 for reopening. Priority 2 is for those lines which require further development or a change in circumstances (such as housing developments).

References

Sources
Awdry, C. (1990), Encyclopaedia of British Railway Companies, Patrick Stephens Ltd, Wellingborough,

External links
A history of the Skipton railways and surrounding area
A history of Grassington railways
Information and photographs from the Embsay & Bolton Abbey Steam Railway
Grassington & Threshfield Station at Disused Railways
Aerial shot of Grassington station and the Threshfield Tramway

Closed railway lines in Yorkshire and the Humber
Rail transport in North Yorkshire
Craven District
Railway companies established in 1897
Railway lines opened in 1902
London, Midland and Scottish Railway constituents